Rientrodolce is an Italian association linked to Radicali Italiani, which concerns itself with overpopulation, natural environment and energy.

Its name comes from Marco Pannella's idea of a "mild return" ("rientro dolce" in Italian) to a world with 2 billion human beings. The association considers overpopulation the primary cause of the humanitarian, environmental and energetic crisis of our planet. It aims to inform and convince the society, the mass media, the intellectuals and the politicians of the necessity, along with the other environmental measures, of a reduction of the world population, in full respect of human rights and individual liberties.

The association has a discussion group, which is not limited to the association's members but it is open to everybody.

External links
 Rientrodolce Association

Environmental organisations based in Italy
Demography
Political associations of Italy